Sam Kerridge (born 26 April 1993) is a former professional Australian rules football player who played for the Adelaide and Carlton Football Club in the Australian Football League (AFL). He was recruited with pick 27 in the 2011 National Draft.

AFL career
Kerridge made his AFL debut in Round 3, 2012, against , starting as the substitute, and did not play another game in a successful year for the side. In 2013, Kerridge played 11 games and established himself as one of Adelaide's main taggers, nullifying the impact of key opposition players including Chris Judd, Ryan Griffen and Grant Birchall. He also showed promise as an offensive player, most notable against  in round 9 where he helped the Crows claim a thrilling come from behind win with 6 goals and 24 disposals, for which he was awarded an AFL Rising Star nomination.

Kerridge played 14 games in 2014 either side of a mid-season foot injury. He continued to rotate between tagging duties (in the absence of regular tagger Nathan van Berlo) and an opportunist small forward role. His best performance was against  once more, in round 13, when he kicked four goals.

In October 2015, Kerridge was traded to the Carlton Football Club along with pick 28 in exchange for Troy Menzel. He immediately found a regular place in the Carlton midfield, playing all but one game for the season and finishing tenth in the best and fairest.

Statistics

|- style="background:#eaeaea;"
! scope="row" style="text-align:center" | 2012
| style="text-align:center" | 
| 29 || 1 || 0 || 0 || 0 || 3 || 3 || 0 || 0 || 0.0 || 0.0 || 0.0 || 3.0 || 3.0 || 0.0 || 0.0
|-
! scope="row" style="text-align:center" | 2013
| style="text-align:center" | 
| 29 || 11 || 13 || 5 || 82 || 79 || 161 || 55 || 31 || 1.2 || 0.5 || 7.5 || 7.2 || 14.6 || 5.0 || 2.8
|- style="background:#eaeaea;"
! scope="row" style="text-align:center" | 2014
| style="text-align:center" | 
| 17 || 14 || 10 || 1 || 72 || 84 || 156 || 33 || 52 || 0.7 || 0.1 || 5.1 || 6.0 || 11.1 || 2.4 || 3.7
|- class="sortbottom"
! colspan=3| Career
! 26
! 23
! 6
! 154
! 166
! 320
! 88
! 83
! 0.9
! 0.2
! 5.9
! 6.4
! 12.3
! 3.4
! 3.2
|}

References

External links

 

1993 births
Living people
Adelaide Football Club players
Sturt Football Club players
Australian rules footballers from Victoria (Australia)
Bendigo Pioneers players
People from Mildura
Adelaide Football Club (SANFL) players
Carlton Football Club players
Preston Football Club (VFA) players